The stout-billed cinclodes (Cinclodes excelsior) is a species of bird in the family Furnariidae. It is found in Colombia, Ecuador, and Peru. Its natural habitats are subtropical or tropical high-altitude shrubland and subtropical or tropical high-altitude grassland.

References

External links
Stout-billed cinclodes videos on the Internet Bird Collection
Stout-billed cinclodes photo gallery VIREO
Photo-Medium Res; Article chandra.as.utexas
Photo-High Res; Article tekipaki

stout-billed cinclodes
Birds of the Colombian Andes
Birds of the Ecuadorian Andes
stout-billed cinclodes
stout-billed cinclodes
Taxonomy articles created by Polbot